The 2019 FIM Ice Speedway World Championship was the 54th edition of the FIM Individual Ice Racing World Championship season. The world champion was determined by ten races hosted in five cities Almata, Shadrinsk, Berlin, Inzell and Heerenveen between 2 February and 31 March 2019.

Daniil Ivanov won the World Championship series to become world champion for the third time.

Final Series

Classification

See also 
 2019 Ice Speedway of Nations

References 

Ice speedway competitions
World